The 1921 municipal election was held December 12, 1921 to elect a mayor and seven aldermen to sit on Edmonton City Council and four trustees to sit on the public school board.  F A French, Paul Jenvrin, Thomas Magee, and Joseph Henri Picard were acclaimed to two-year terms on the separate school board.

There were ten aldermen seats on city council, but three of the positions were still filled from the previous election: Joseph Adair, James Collisson, and Valentine Richards were all elected to two-year terms in 1920 and were still in office. William Campbell McArthur had also been elected to a two-year term, but had resigned in order to run for mayor.  Andrew McLennan had also been elected to a two-year term only to resign.  In order to fill these vacancies, Izena Ross and Kenneth Alexander Blatchford, the least popular of the top seven candidates, were elected to one-year terms.

Izena Ross, first elected in 1921, was Edmonton's first woman city councillor. 

There were seven trustees on the public school board, but only four posts were open - three of the positions were already filled: W H Alexander, E T Bishop, and William Rea had all been elected to two-year terms in 1920 and were still in office.

The same was true on the separate board. Only four posts were open - J Cormack, J J Murray, and Joseph Gariépy were continuing.

The 1921 election was the first in which a woman - Izena Ross - was elected to city council.

Voter turnout

Out of 33256 eligible voters, 10,943 cast ballots, for a voter turnout of 32.8%. (The vote count is much higher than that because each voter could cast up to seven votes in the aldermanic election.)

Results

 bold indicates elected
 italics indicate incumbent
 South Side, where data is available, indicates representative for Edmonton's South Side, with a minimum South Side representation instituted after the city of Strathcona, south of the North Saskatchewan River, amalgamated with Edmonton on February 1, 1912.

Mayor

Aldermen
Block Voting was used to elect the city councillors (aldermen). Each voter could cast up to seven votes.
About 63,000 votes were cast in this election by about 10,000 voters.
The Civic Government Association ran seven candidates and received the largest block of votes. But only its most popular candidate received support from a majority of voters. His supporters did not mark all their other six votes for CGA candidates and only six but not seven on the slate were elected.

Izena Ross, elected in 1921, was the first woman to run for a seat on the Edmonton city council. Her vote tally, showing support from about a third of the voters, was enough to win a seat.

Due to the guaranteed southside representation, southsider Pratt was given a two-year term, although he was the least popular successful candidate. Blatchford and Ross each were elected just to one-yer terms. Pratt lived at 11132 87th Avenue

Public school trustees

Under the minimum South Side representation rule, Crang was elected over Grant.

Separate (Catholic) school trustees

F A French (South Side), Paul Jenvrin, Thomas Magee, and Joseph Henri Picard were acclaimed.

References

Election History, City of Edmonton: Elections and Census Office

1921
1921 elections in Canada
1921 in Alberta